Westfield is a village in Westfield Township, Clark County, Illinois, United States. The population was 536 at the 2020 census, down from 601 at the 2010 census.

History
The village of Westfield was laid out in 1839, and a post office opened there  on  June 18, 1840. The community did not incorporate until August 31, 1875.
Westfield College operated here from 1865 until 1914. The school was founded by the Church of the United Brethren in Christ in 1861 as a seminary, then was incorporated as a coeducational college in 1865. The peak enrollment was 160, in 1909. However, enrollment declined sharply thereafter, and financial problems forced the school to close in 1914. The building was used as the Westfield Township high school from 1914 until being destroyed by fire in 1917.

Geography

Demographics

As of the 2020 census there were 536 people, 248 households, and 154 families residing in the village. The racial makeup of the village was 97.01% White, 0.93% African American, 0.19% Native American, and 1.87% from two or more races. Hispanic or Latino of any race were 0.75% of the population.

There were 248 households, out of which 37.90% had children under the age of 18 living with them, 49.19% were married couples living together, 4.44% had a female householder with no husband present, and 37.90% were non-families. 33.87% of all households were made up of individuals, and 24.19% had someone living alone who was 65 years of age or older. The average household size was 2.79 and the average family size was 2.30.

The village's age distribution consisted of 20.0% under the age of 18, 10.2% from 18 to 24, 14.8% from 25 to 44, 28.3% from 45 to 64, and 26.8% who were 65 years of age or older. The median age was 48.0 years. For every 100 females, there were 104.3 males. For every 100 females age 18 and over, there were 115.1 males.

The median income for a household in the village was $53,421, and the median income for a family was $54,605. Males had a median income of $32,794 versus $22,411 for females. The per capita income for the village was $26,040. About 4.5% of families and 6.8% of the population were below the poverty line, including 4.4% of those under age 18 and 9.2% of those age 65 or over.

Schools
Westfield is part of the Casey-Westfield School District. The district has two buildings all in the city of Casey, IL.  Monroe Elementary (K-6) and Casey-Westfield Jr-Sr High School (7-12).

Churches
Westfield is served by two churches.  The Westfield United Methodist Church is the result of the merger of the Methodist Church and the Evangelical United Brethren (EUB) Church in 1968.  The new church uses the building built by the EUB church in 1918 at the corner of Madison and Elm Streets.  The Westfield Baptist Church has moved into the former Methodist Church building at the corner of State and Fulton Streets.  The original wood frame Baptist Church building has been converted to a private home.

References

External links
 Westfield History at Genealogy Trails.

Populated places in Clark County, Illinois
Villages in Illinois
Populated places established in 1839
1839 establishments in Illinois